The Bristol Hurricanes are a British-Lithuanian basketball club, based in the city of Bristol in the south-west of England.

History
The club was founded in 2017 as Hengrove Park, playing at the city's sports centre of the same name and entering into the local West of England League. Hengrove were immediately successful, winning Division 1 and the West of England Cup in their first season.  Following from this success, the club entered the English Basketball League the following season and rebranded as the Bristol Hurricanes. The new name did not hinder the club's continued success, sweeping the South West League with a perfect 14-0 record, and finishing as runners-up in the National Playoffs. Following the reorganisation of the league in 2019, the Hurricanes were placed in Division 2 North, effectively being promoted 2 levels after just one season in the national system.

Honours
Men's Division 4 South West Champions (1):  2018-19 
West of England Cup (2): 2017-18, 2018-19
European Amateur Basketball League Bristol Grand Prix (1): 2018-19

Players

Season-by-season records

References

Basketball teams in England
2017 establishments in England
Basketball teams established in 2017
Diaspora sports clubs in the United Kingdom
Lithuanian diaspora in Europe
Sport in Bristol